The 1975 Swedish motorcycle Grand Prix was the ninth round of the 1975 Grand Prix motorcycle racing season. It took place on the weekend of 18–20 July 1975 at the Scandinavian Raceway.

500cc classification

References

Swedish motorcycle Grand Prix
Swedish
Motorcycle Grand Prix